Joseph P. Busch (Feb. 12, 1926 - June 27, 1975) was Los Angeles’ 36th district attorney.

Professional life and career

He attended to the University of Texas in 1947, were he obtained his Bachelor of Arts, and also went to Loyola Law School.
He entered as District attorney in 1970 after U.S. District Judge A. Andrew Hauk turned the job down.

In office and later life
For almost 20 years, Busch had been with the District Attorney’s Office when he was chosen for the top job, he joined as a deputy district attorney in 1952, as he escaled different ranks serving as director of special operations, assistant district attorney and chief deputy district attorney. He win the job outright in a 1972 election in a close election over famed prosecutor Vincent Bugliosi.

Six new branch offices were created by Busch and instituted the Organized Crime and Pornography Division, Consumer and Environmental Protection Division and Bureau of Community Affairs, among others.

He died in his sleep at the age of 49 at his West Covina, California home, it was believed that came from natural causes.

Personal life

Busch was married to Jennie Rosario, and also he had three sons, Joseph, Steven and David.

References

1926 births
1975 deaths
People from Chicago
District attorneys in California
Loyola Law School alumni
University of Texas at Austin alumni